DAAS Icon (also known as Icon) is the first and only studio album recorded and released by Australian comedy trio, the Doug Anthony All Stars.  Released in 1990, it features the singles "I Want to Spill the Blood of a Hippy" and "Bottle". Icon went on to become the highest-selling independent album in Australia, but was banned in the UK due to a reference to the IRA in the song "KRSNA".  This was later overturned by a British court.

At the ARIA Music Awards of 1991, the album was nominated for Best New Talent and Best Comedy Release.

The tracks "Little Gospel Song" and "Change the Blades" previously appeared on their demo tape Let It Swing in 1988. The track "Shang-a-lang" samples part of the drum intro from the Beastie Boys' "She's Crafty".

Track listing
All tracks capitalised as on the back cover (for CD) and inner sleeve (for LP).

Personnel
 Produced by DAAS and The Cockle Factor
 Engineered by Ross Cockle and Melita Jagic
 All songs by Control
 Richard Fidler – guitars, sitar, Irish harp, axe and dinner plates, backing and harmony vocals
 Paul McDermott – lead vocals (tracks 1-5, 7, 8, 12, 14, 15), kettle drum, erhu, viola, sheet metals and cymbals, harmony vocals
 Tim Ferguson – lead vocals (tracks 6 and 9), keyboards, Fairlight, euphonium, kora, bachelors rags, backing and harmony vocals
 Andrew – brass
 Steve Hadley – double bass
 Rosie Westbrook – electric bass, double bass
 Angus Burchell, J.J. Hackett – drums
 Sam See – drum programmer
 Kerri Simpson – vocals
 Richard Lewis – artwork

Charts

References

External links 
 Icon at Discogs (list of versions)
 Purchase Icon on the iTunes Music Store

Doug Anthony All Stars albums
1990 albums